Edmund Merriman Cooper (9 September 1912 – January 2003) was a Bermudian swimmer. He competed in two events at the 1936 Summer Olympics: the men's 400 metres freestyle (with a time of 5:53.8) and the 4x200 metres freestyle relay. His brother, Forster Cooper, and son, Edmund Kirkland Cooper, were also both Olympians—in swimming and sailing, respectively.

References

External links
 

1912 births
2003 deaths
Bermudian male freestyle swimmers
Olympic swimmers of Bermuda
Swimmers at the 1936 Summer Olympics
People from Pembroke Parish